Double Dribble is a 1946 Disney theatrical cartoon short that spoofs the sport of basketball and stars Goofy. It is directed by Jack Hannah.

Plot
A series of characters of the same species as Goofy are playing a game of college basketball, with one team representing "U.U." and the other representing the hopelessly outmatched and undersized "P.U." The short primarily focuses on a wide gamut of physically impossible and illegal stunts taken by each team. In the end, P.U. wins the match on a last-second shot that sends a P.U. player through the basket (although it appears to be P.U.'s own basket).

The game ends with the lone fan in the stands, presumably Goofy himself, singing the P.U. alma mater. (When the series was edited for television, this character was voiced by Jeff Bennett with a very different voice, more closely resembling the voice of Mr. Smee from Disney adaptations of Peter Pan.)

Production
As an inside joke, the players are named for members of Disney's staff: Kinney, Lounsbery, Hannah and Sibley.

Voice cast
 Goofy: Pinto Colvig

Releases
1946 – theatrical release
1956 – Disneyland, episode #3.6: "Goofy's Cavalcade of Sports" (TV)
1972 – The Mouse Factory, episode #1.12: "Spectator Sports" (TV)
1976 – "Superstar Goofy" (TV)
1981 – "Goofy Over Sports" (TV)
c. 1983 – Good Morning, Mickey!, episode #25 (TV)
1987 – "An All-New Adventure of Disney's Sport Goofy" (TV)
c. 1992 – Mickey's Mouse Tracks, episode #69 (TV)
c. 1992 – Donald's Quack Attack, episode #21 (TV)
1998 – The Ink and Paint Club, episode #35: "More Sports Goofy" (TV)
2011 – Have a Laugh!, episode #20 (TV)

Home media
The short was released on December 2, 2002, on Walt Disney Treasures: The Complete Goofy.

Additional releases include:
1983 – "Cartoon Classics: More Sport Goofy" (VHS)
2005 – "Classic Cartoon Favorites: Extreme Sports Fun" (DVD)

See also 
 List of Disney animated shorts—1940s

References

External links
 
 

1946 films
1946 animated films
1940s sports films
1940s Disney animated short films
Films directed by Jack Hannah
Films produced by Walt Disney
Goofy (Disney) short films
Basketball animation
American basketball films
Films scored by Oliver Wallace